Kempie Rautenbach (born 25 April 1988) is a South African rugby union player, currently playing with the . His regular position is centre.

Career

Youth
He was involved in the Under-21 Provincial Championship competition for Potchefstroom-based side  in the 2009 season. In addition, he also played Varsity Cup rugby for the local university team  in 2010 and 2011.

Senior career
In 2010, he was included in the  senior squad for the 2010 Currie Cup Premier Division competition.

References

South African rugby union players
Living people
1988 births
Leopards (rugby union) players
SWD Eagles players
Rugby union centres
Rugby union players from Mpumalanga